is a Japanese voice actress affiliated with Aoni Production. Some of her notable roles include Michiru in Hell Girl, Glenda in Strike the Blood, Delmin in Show by Rock!!, and Yaeka Sakuragi in The Yakuza's Guide to Babysitting.

Biography
Watada was born in Iwate Prefecture and raised in Shizuoka Prefecture. During her elementary years, she enjoyed recording herself and her friends' voices on cassette tapes, and also developed a yearning for acting after seeing a local theater performance. She became interested in voice acting after seeing videos of actors recording their lines, which she was fascinated by.

Watada cites Ikue Ōtani as an influence, stating that she loved her performance as Stephanie Tanner in the Japanese dub of the American sitcom Full House, and that she wanted to play the role of a child in a dubbed series. In 2017, she voiced Pamela in the dub of the sequel series Fuller House.

Filmography

Television animation
2016
 Myriad Colors Phantom World as Arina
 Battle Spirits Double Drive as Kento Mogami, Mofumofu
 ClassicaLoid as Miiko

2017
 Kemono Friends as Golden Snub-Nosed Monkey
 Chibi Maruko-chan as Yasuko
 Princess Principal as Amy Anderson
 Hell Girl: The Fourth Twilight as Michiru
 Magical Circle Guru Guru as Chikurima
 Just Because! as Mutsuki Morikawa
 Altair: A Record of Battles as Nicole

2018
 Uma Musume Pretty Derby as Meisho Doto
 Case Closed as Miona Yuri
 Sirius the Jaeger as Lalisa

2019
 Hitori Bocchi no Marumaru Seikatsu as Yanai Himeji
 Afterlost as Karin

2020
 Show by Rock!! Mashumairesh!! as Delmin
 If My Favorite Pop Idol Made It to the Budokan, I Would Die as Yūka Teramoto
 Sakura Wars the Animation as Clara
 Digimon Adventure as Hikari Yagami

2021
 Show by Rock!! Stars!! as Delmin
 Love Live! Superstar!! as Sumire's younger sister
 Sakugan as Muro

2022
 In the Heart of Kunoichi Tsubaki as Ume
 The Yakuza's Guide to Babysitting as Yaeka Sakuragi
 Parallel World Pharmacy as Chiyu Yakutani
 Shadows House 2nd Season as Margaret
 Sylvanian Families: Flare no Happy Diary as Creme Chocolate
 Bocchi the Rock! as Futari Gotoh

Original video animation
2017
 Strike the Blood as Glenda

Original net animation
2021
 The Heike Story as Taira no Takakiyo
 The Missing 8 as Corey

Video games
2016
 Hōkago Girls Tribe as Chidori Ōgi

2018
 God Eater Resonant Ops as Shante
 God Eater 3 as Player (Female), Sho Pennywort
 Kōsei Girl as Albari

2019
 Blade Xlord as Tam-Tam
 Renshin Astral as Jose

2020
 Touhou Spell Bubble as Flandre Scarlet
 Quiz RPG: The World of Mystic Wiz as Chitose
 Show by Rock!! Fes A Live as Delmin
 Atelier Ryza 2: Lost Legends & the Secret Fairy as Fi

2021
 Hexagon Dungeon: The Arcana's Stone as Lilith
 Rakugaki Kingdom as Sherry Jerry, Flandre Scarlet
 Uma Musume Pretty Derby as Meisho Doto
 Maglam Lord as Julette

2022
 Fate/Grand Order as Xu Fu
 Digimon Survive as Miu Shinonome

Drama CD
2017
 Orenchi no Maid-san as Micchan
 Onsen Musume as Kanade Baden Yufuin
 Sister-in-Law! as Lulu

2020
 The Yakuza's Guide to Babysitting as Yaeka Sakuragi

Notes

References

External links
 Official agency profile 
 

Aoni Production voice actors
Japanese video game actresses
Japanese voice actresses
Living people
Voice actresses from Shizuoka Prefecture
Year of birth missing (living people)